This is a list of franchise records for the Nashville Predators of the National Hockey League (updated through May 9, 2022).

Career regular season leaders

Skaters

Goaltenders
 Minimum 50 games

 Minimum 50 games

Single season records

Skaters

Goaltenders

Career playoff leaders

Skaters

Goaltenders

Single season
Goals: Filip Forsberg, 9 (2016–17)
Assists: Ryan Johansen; Viktor Arvidsson; Mattias Ekholm; P. K. Subban, 10 (2016–17)
Points: Filip Forsberg, 16 (2016–17, 2017–18)
Wins: Pekka Rinne, 14 (2016–17)

Team

Single season
Points: 117 (2017–18)  	 
Wins: 53 (2017–18) 
Losses: 47 (1998–99)
Goals scored: 266 (2006–07)

See also
List of Nashville Predators players
List of Nashville Predators seasons

References

External links
Hockey-Reference – Nashville Predators Franchise Index

Records
National Hockey League statistical records
records